FPT Center for Young Talents (abbreviation: FYT) is a Vietnamese organization founded in 1999 by the then-CEO of FPT Corporation, Truong Gia Binh. FYT selects members who are mostly freshmen and sophomores, based on criteria such as creativity, perseverance, leadership skills, prizes on national and International Science Olympiads, etc. Today it has more than 350 alumni.

Objectives and principles  
FYT is a special educational organization aiming at recruiting young talents of the country, fostering their self-development which leads to success and contributions to the country's prosperity

Objectives 
FYT helps its members to become versatile students, provides them career orientation, as well as start-up orientation.

Principles 
The operation of FYT is based on three main principles :
 Self-operation: Members are required to be active, and creative.
 Competitiveness: FYT has the authority to expel members who do not ensure the required individual progress. 
 Socialization: FYT calls for the help of individuals and organizations who share the same vision.

Admission requirements  
The following criteria are supporting factors for student wish to apply FYT:
 Attending universities and/or institutes at Hanoi.
 Having experience and products in the field of technology and/or in other fields.
 Having obtained high results in national and/or international Olympiads, high school achievements.
 Having strong motivation for developing community.

If their application file is chosen, candidates must then pass 4 other tests, including the IQ and English Test, Essay Writing, Teamwork, and Interview.

Activities  
FYT's membership duration is 2 years. Students admitted to the organization earn a scholarship of 14 440 000 VND, as well as necessary materials. Members are also encouraged to test their ideas, take part in projects of the FPT Corporation. Based on demands and wishes of members, FYT will hold training courses or seminars on different topics within their abilities. FYT is connected to many organizations inside and outside FPT. FYT is divided into groups. The members organize their own specialized groups in which they have chances to self-improve and interchange ideas. Every month, FYT holds meetings with specialists in many areas, leaders of FPT or of other corporations to discuss arising problems and situations. Members can also enjoy tournaments of football or cultural and sport activities of FPT.

Notable people 
 , former president of FPT University 
 Nguyễn Hòa Bình, Sharktank investor and TV personality, President of Next Tech Group
 Vương Quang Khải, President of Zalo Group, which owns the most popular messaging app in Vietnam 
 Vương Vũ Thắng, Founder of VCCorp, Vietnam's biggest media group.
 Phạm Kim Hùng, Founder and CEO, Base.vn, acquired by FPT Corporation
 Nguyễn Tiến Dũng, Founder of Moca, one of top 3 payment companies in Vietnam, acquired by Grab
 Hồ Sỹ Việt Anh (Andy Ho), CTO of Axie Infinity, unicorn blockchain gaming startup

References

Youth organizations based in Vietnam